Big Dog Daddy is the eleventh studio album by American country music artist Toby Keith. It was released on June 12, 2007 by Show Dog Nashville. Its first single, "High Maintenance Woman," which was released before the album came out, peaked at number three on the country charts. The album debuted at #1 on the Billboard 200 and the Billboard Top Country Albums chart, selling 204,000 copies in its first week. It was Keith's third number one on the Billboard 200 and his fifth on the Top Country Albums chart. In addition, this was the first album of Keith's career that he produced entirely on his own, having previously co-produced all but his first two albums.

Critical reception 

AllMusic's Stephen Thomas Erlewine gave praise to Keith's talents as a singer-songwriter, noting his storytelling abilities on the record's two covers and his exploration of both his sensitive and partying sides on "Wouldn't Wanna Be Ya" as "remarkably affecting", concluding with "And that's the real secret to Keith's success: underneath all the bragging he's a songwriter and a damn good one at that, which this lean, sinewy, stripped-to-the-basics record makes clear." Kathi Kamen Goldmark of Common Sense Media praised the musicianship and discussions of social class and wealth in America throughout the album but found criticism in some tracks containing alcohol debauchery and saccharine sentiment, concluding that Keith is "a man who's not afraid to be himself -- someone who knows his way around both small-town America and a musical hook, and isn't afraid to use it." Entertainment Weekly writer Ken Tucker praised Keith for delivering "artistic sincerity" and clever delivery and wordplay throughout the track listing, concluding that "All of this suggests Keith understands that beyond its default mode of rowdiness, country music is the soundtrack for adulthood, its pleasures as well as its disillusionments."

Track listing

Personnel 
Credits for Big Dog Daddy adapted from AllMusic.
 Tom Bukovac – electric guitar
 Carter's Chord (Becky, Emily and Joanna Robertson) – background vocals
 Perry Coleman – background vocals
 Chad Cromwell – drums
 Eric Darken – percussion
 Shannon Forrest – drums
 Paul Franklin – steel guitar, Dobro
 Kenny Greenberg – electric guitar
 Aubrey Haynie – fiddle, mandolin
 Rob Ickes – Dobro
 Clayton Ivey – piano, keyboards
 Toby Keith – lead vocals, background vocals
 Jerry McPherson – electric guitar
 Brent Mason – electric guitar
 Mac McAnally – acoustic guitar
 Steve Nathan – piano, keyboards
 Dave Pomeroy – bass guitar
 Randy Scruggs – acoustic guitar
 Glenn Worf – bass guitar
 Jonathan Yudkin – strings

Chart performance

Weekly charts

Year-end charts

References 

2007 albums
Toby Keith albums
Show Dog-Universal Music albums
Albums produced by Toby Keith